Werner Primm (6 March 1904 – 1988) was a German sculptor. His work was part of the sculpture event in the art competition at the 1936 Summer Olympics.

References

1904 births
1988 deaths
20th-century German sculptors
20th-century German male artists
German male sculptors
Olympic competitors in art competitions
People from Legnica